William Ward Pigman (March 5, 1910 – September 30, 1977) was a chairman of the Department of Biochemistry at New York Medical College, and a suspected Soviet Union spy as part of the "Karl group" for Soviet Military Intelligence (GRU).

Biography
He was born on March 5, 1910.

He had a Ph.D in chemistry. He worked for the National Bureau of Standards and the Labor and Public Welfare Committee.  Earlier he had been a professor at the University of Alabama.

He supplied documents to Whittaker Chambers and J. Peters for Soviet intelligence as early as 1936. In his book, Witness, Whittaker Chambers refers to Pigman using the pseudonym "Abel Gross". The Gorsky Memo cites him as "114th".

In 1954, he was at the Department of Biochemistry, of the New York Medical College.

He died on September 30, 1977 in Woods Hole, Massachusetts from a heart attack.

Works

See also

 List of American spies
 John Abt
 Whittaker Chambers
 Noel Field
 Harold Glasser
 John Herrmann
 Alger Hiss
 Donald Hiss
 Victor Perlo
 J. Peters
 Lee Pressman
 Vincent Reno
 Julian Wadleigh
 Harold Ware
 Nathaniel Weyl
 Harry Dexter White
 Nathan Witt

References

Further reading

 Allen Weinstein, Perjury: The Hiss–Chambers Case (New York: Random House, 1997).

External links

20th-century American chemists
American spies for the Soviet Union
Espionage in the United States
University of Alabama faculty
New York Medical College faculty
1910 births
1977 deaths
Scientists from New York (state)